Samuel Ames (June 29, 1824 in Champlain, Clinton County, New York – July 4, 1875 in Keeseville, Essex County, New York) was an American lawyer, banker and politician from New York.

Life
He was the son of Charles Ames. He attended Champlain Academy and Keeseville Academy. Then he studied law with George A. Simmons, was admitted to the bar in 1847, and commenced practice in partnership with Simmons in Keeseville.  In 1849, he married Elizabeth Thompson (c.1825–1898), and they had three children. In 1860, he succeeded his father-in-law as Cashier of the Essex County Bank. In 1870, he became a director of the Keeseville and Montreal Railroad. In 1871, he became Cashier of the Keeseville Bank.

He entered politics as a Whig, and joined the Republican Party upon its foundation. He was a member of the New York State Senate (16th D.) in 1872 and 1873, but missed most of both sessions due to ill health.

He was buried at the Evergreen Cemetery in Keeseville.

Sources
 Life Sketches of Executive Officers and Members of the Legislature of the State of New York by William H. McElroy & Alexander McBride (1873; pg. 53f) [e-book]
 Evergreen Cemetery transcriptions at RootsWeb
 Bio transcribed from History of Essex County (1885)
 OBITUARY; HON. SAMUEL AMES in NYT on July 6, 1875

1824 births
1875 deaths
Republican Party New York (state) state senators
People from Champlain, New York
19th-century American railroad executives
American bankers
People from Keeseville, New York
19th-century American politicians